Keith D'Andre Lewis (born October 20, 1981 in Sacramento, California) is a former American football safety. He was drafted by the San Francisco 49ers in the sixth round in 2004 NFL Draft. He played college football at Oregon.

Lewis has also been a member of the Arizona Cardinals and Carolina Panthers.

External links
Arizona Cardinals bio

1981 births
Living people
Players of American football from Sacramento, California
American football safeties
Oregon Ducks football players
San Francisco 49ers players
Arizona Cardinals players
Carolina Panthers players